Events in the year 1823 in Spain.

Incumbents
King: Ferdinand VII

Events
January 23 - secret treaty signed at Verona, Italy, allowing French intervention in Spain to restore Ferdinand VII to absolute rule 
January 28 - King Louis XVIII of France announces creation of the Hundred Thousand Sons of Saint Louis
February - French legislature, controlled by Ultra-Royalists vote to support the intervention
April 6 - French cross the river Bidasoa on the Franco-Spanish border
April 7 - French troops enter Spain  mostly unopposed
May 24 - French Troops take Madrid
August 31 - Spanish liberal revolutionaries suffer a major defeat against the French at the Battle of Trocadero
September 23 - Cadiz falls to the French, ending the liberal revolution and restoring Ferdinand VII to the throne

Births

Deaths

 November 7 - Rafael del Riego, liberal politician, general and revolutionary; executed by Ferdinand VII for leading the liberal revolution against him (b. 1784)

References 

 
1820s in Spain